Hopkins Farm is a national historic district and farm complex located at Pittsford in Monroe County, New York, United States. It consists of 15 contributing buildings, eight contributing structures, and one contributing site on a  farm. The largest group of structures are clustered around the farmhouse, built about 1815 in a vernacular Federal style, and includes two barns, several outbuildings, and two tenant houses.

It was listed on the National Register of Historic Places in 2000.

References

Farms on the National Register of Historic Places in New York (state)
Historic districts on the National Register of Historic Places in New York (state)
Federal architecture in New York (state)
Houses completed in 1815
Buildings and structures in Monroe County, New York
National Register of Historic Places in Monroe County, New York